Hayes Creek is a small river in San Francisco, California, that has been largely culverted. The only remaining portion above ground is in the Mission Creek Channel that drains into China Basin.

Notes

Rivers of San Francisco
Subterranean rivers of the United States
Rivers of Northern California
Tributaries of San Francisco Bay